Güstrow station is a railway station in the municipality of Güstrow, located in the Rostock district in Mecklenburg-Vorpommern, Germany.

References

Railway stations in Mecklenburg-Western Pomerania
Railway stations in Germany opened in 1850
1850 establishments in Prussia
Buildings and structures in Rostock (district)
Rostock S-Bahn stations